Taman Flora Utama (Jawi: تامن فلور اوتام) is a township in Bandar Penggaram, Batu Pahat, Johor, Malaysia. It was constructed in 2005. Taman Flora Utama is located beside Jalan Tan Siew Hoe. The new township is developing rapidly. This township is mainly for shopping, leisure and commercial activities.

There are many shophouses in this township. Two shopping malls are also located in this township, a Carrefour hypermarket and the Square One Shopping Mall. There is a McDonald's drive-through. This township is under the control of Majlis Perbandaran Batu Pahat (MPBP).

See also 

 Batu Pahat
 Bandar Penggaram,Batu Pahat
 Majlis Perbandaran Batu Pahat
 SMK Tinggi Batu Pahat
 Taman Setia Jaya 2
 Pura Kencana
 Taman Bukit Pasir
 Segenting (石文丁)
 Pantai Minyak Beku
 Batu Pahat Mall

External links
 Majlis Perbandaran Batu Pahat's official site. 

Batu Pahat District
Townships in Johor